The New Tradition Chorus is a men's barbershop chorus based in Northbrook, Illinois, in the Chicago area.  Founded in 1982, they have competed at the International Chorus Contest of the Barbershop Harmony Society 19 times, winning a medal on every attempt until the 2009 competition, where they finished 15th.  They have won ten bronze medals, a record eight consecutive silver medals (1993–2000), and the gold medal in 2001.

Director
Mitch Greenberg became the chorus director in 2021, with ten years of directing experience. Greenberg is a quartet singer and has placed in the top 20 in international competition.

References

A cappella musical groups
Barbershop Harmony Society choruses
Musical groups established in 1982
Northbrook, Illinois
1982 establishments in Illinois